INS Satpura (F48) is a   stealth multi-role frigate built for the Indian Navy. This class is an improvement over the preceding s with increased stealth and land attack features.

Construction 

INS Satpura was built at the Mazagon Dock Limited (MDL) in Mumbai. The keel was laid on 31 October 2002 and was launched on 4 June 2004. She was completed in 2010 and underwent sea trials before being commissioned on 20 August 2011 into the Eastern Naval Command headquartered at Visakhapatnam.

Service history

Images

References

External links

Shivalik-class frigates
Frigates of the Indian Navy
2004 ships
Ships built in India